Phee Boon Poh is a Malaysian politician and currently serves as Penang State Executive Councillor.

Election results

References 

Democratic Action Party (Malaysia) politicians
21st-century Malaysian politicians
Members of the Penang State Legislative Assembly
Penang state executive councillors
Living people
People from Penang
Malaysian people of Chinese descent
1951 births